Ermin Šiljak (born 11 May 1973) is a Slovenian former professional footballer who played as a centre forward.

International career
Šiljak played for the Slovenia national team and was a participant at the Euro 2000. He scored nine goals in nine games in UEFA Euro 2004 qualifying.

Managerial career

Early career
Šiljak managed Slovenian under-16 and under-19 national teams.

In 2012, he was a manager of Olimpija Ljubljana.

Botev Plovdiv
Šiljak joined Botev Plovdiv in July 2015. He made a debut in a match against the local rivals Lokomotiv Plovdiv. Plovdiv derby ended in a 1–1 draw.

Šiljak achieved five wins, three draws, and five defeats in his first thirteen games as a manager of Botev Plovdiv in A Grupa. On 27 October 2015, Botev Plovdiv was eliminated in the Round of 16 of the Bulgarian Cup after a 1–0 defeat to FC Sozopol. After that, Šiljak expelled Yordan Hristov, Mariyan Ognyanov, Plamen Nikolov, and Joël Tshibamba from the first team. The changes did not lead to any positive results with young players as his team lost twice in a row in A Grupa: a 2–0 away defeat to Slavia Sofia and a 3–1 home defeat to Beroe Stara Zagora.

After less than six months, at the end of November 2015, Šiljak resigned as a manager of Botev Plovdiv.

Dalian Transcendence
On 21 April 2016, China League One club Dalian Transcendence signed Ermin Šiljak as manager for two years. By August however, Šiljak was sacked by the team due to financial reasons.

Career statistics
Scores and results list Slovenia's goal tally first.

Honours
Olimpija Ljubljana
Prva liga: 1993–94, 1994–95; runner-up: 1995–96
Slovenian Cup: 1995–96

Bastia
Intertoto Cup: 1997

Servette
National League A: 1998–99
Swiss Cup: 2001

Hammarby IF
Allsvenskan: 2001

Dalian Shide
Chinese FA Cup: runner-up 2003

Mouscron
Belgian Cup: runner-up 2005–06

Individual
 Slovenian PrvaLiga top scorer: 1995–96 (28 goals in 33 games)
 AFC Champions League top scorer: 2004 (8 goals in 8 games)
 Best scorer of all qualifications of the UEFA Euro 2004 (9 goals)

References

External links
Player profile at NZS 

1973 births
Living people
Footballers from Ljubljana
Slovenian footballers
Association football forwards
Slovenian expatriate footballers
Slovenia under-21 international footballers
Slovenia international footballers
NK Svoboda Ljubljana players
Slovenian PrvaLiga players
NK Olimpija Ljubljana (1945–2005) players
Slovenian expatriate sportspeople in France
Expatriate footballers in France
Ligue 1 players
SC Bastia players
Slovenian expatriate sportspeople in Switzerland
Expatriate footballers in Switzerland
Swiss Super League players
Servette FC players
Slovenian expatriate sportspeople in Sweden
Expatriate footballers in Sweden
Allsvenskan players
Hammarby Fotboll players
Slovenian expatriate sportspeople in Greece
Expatriate footballers in Greece
Super League Greece players
Panionios F.C. players
Slovenian expatriate sportspeople in China
Expatriate footballers in China
Chinese Super League players
Dalian Shide F.C. players
Slovenian expatriate sportspeople in Belgium
Expatriate footballers in Belgium
Belgian Pro League players
Royal Excel Mouscron players
Slovenian football managers
NK Olimpija Ljubljana (2005) managers
Slovenian expatriate football managers
Slovenian expatriate sportspeople in Bulgaria
Expatriate football managers in Bulgaria
Botev Plovdiv managers
Expatriate football managers in China
Dalian Transcendence F.C. managers
China League One managers
UEFA Euro 2000 players